Corey Johnson (born John Johnson; May 17, 1961) is an American character actor largely active in the UK, known for his supporting roles in Hellboy, Kingsman: The Secret Service, Captain Philips, The Bourne Ultimatum, Kick-Ass, Ex Machina, the Spooks episode "The Special", the Doctor Who episode "Dalek" and The Last Days of Lehman Brothers as Richard S. Fuld, Jr., the final chairman & CEO of Lehman Brothers.

Personal life
Johnson was born John Johnson in New Orleans, Louisiana. He was one of five children, having two brothers and two sisters. One of his brothers is a sports talk radio personality in New Orleans. He trained professionally at London's Central School of Speech and Drama where he met actress Lucy Cohu. The two married but they later divorced.

Career
His films include Out for a Kill, The Contract, The Bourne Ultimatum, The Bourne Legacy, Saving Private Ryan, Guillermo del Toro's adaptation of Hellboy, the 2005 Ray Bradbury film A Sound of Thunder, and Harrison's Flowers. He also appeared in the award-winning mini series by HBO; Band of Brothers. Johnson had a breakout year in 1999, first playing the wiseguy American tomb-raider Daniels in The Mummy, then the bungling, dim-witted assassin Bruno Decker in Do Not Disturb opposite William Hurt and Michael Chiklis.

Johnson appeared as smug business tycoon Henry van Statten in "Dalek", an episode of the 2005 revival of Doctor Who. Other TV guest spots include Spooks, Foyle's War, Celeb and Nash Bridges. He played the role of Louis Nacke II, a passenger, in United 93. In April 2007, Johnson made his Broadway debut as Nixon's Chief of Staff Jack Brennan in Frost/Nixon.

While appearing on Broadway, Johnson also filmed The Caller starring Elliott Gould and Frank Langella.

In 2004, Johnson was nominated for a Best Actor award at the British TMAs for his portrayal of Eddie Carbone in Arthur Miller's A View from the Bridge. He has also provided voice acting for several video games including the video game tie-in with the movie Reign of Fire and Constantine.

Johnson then played The Judge/Saint Peter in The Last Days of Judas Iscariot at the Almeida Theatre in London.

Until 19 September 2014, Johnson played Mitch in Benedict Andrews' revival of Tennessee Williams' A Streetcar Named Desire at the Young Vic theatre in London, alongside Gillian Anderson and Ben Foster. Johnson's performance was described as "lovely" and "measured" by The Evening Standard'''s theatre critic and the overall production also received considerable critical acclaim. In 2015, he played a helicopter pilot in the science fiction film Ex Machina'', starring Alicia Vikander, Domhnall Gleeson and Oscar Isaac.

Filmography

Film

Television

Video games

Stage

References

External links 

 Lucky You Website

1961 births
American male film actors
Living people
Male actors from New Orleans
Male actors from Louisiana
American expatriate male actors in the United Kingdom
American expatriates in the United Kingdom
American expatriates in England
American male voice actors
20th-century American male actors
21st-century American male actors
American male television actors